{{DISPLAYTITLE:C41H67NO15}}
The molecular formula C41H67NO15 (molar mass: 813.968 g/mol, exact mass: 813.4511 u) may refer to:

 Midecamycin
 Troleandomycin (TAO)

Molecular formulas